Gaurena forsteri is a moth in the family Drepanidae. It is found in Nepal, Tibet in China and India.

References

Moths described in 1966
Thyatirinae